The following is a list of the municipalities (comuni) of Tuscany, Italy.

There are 273 municipalities in Tuscany (as of January 2019):

36 in the Province of Arezzo
41 in the Metropolitan City of Florence
28 in the Province of Grosseto
19 in the Province of Livorno
33 in the Province of Lucca
17 in the Province of Massa-Carrara
37 in the Province of Pisa
20 in the Province of Pistoia
7 in the Province of Prato
35 in the Province of Siena

List

See also
List of municipalities of Italy

References

 
Geography of Tuscany
Tuscany